The Order of National Security Merit (Hangul: 보국훈장) is one of South Korea's orders of merit. It is awarded by the President of South Korea for "outstanding meritorious services in the interest of national security."

Grades 

The order is divided into five grades.

The Exemplary Public Official Medal is also awarded for exemplary public official with 6th Grade (Assistant Director level) or under.

See also 

 Orders, decorations, and medals of South Korea

References

External links
 Images of the Order of Service Merit (in Korean with some English)

Military awards and decorations of South Korea
Orders, decorations, and medals of South Korea
Order of National Security Merit members